Clifford Fanis (born 4 July 1979) is a former West Indian cricketer. Fanis' batting and bowling styles are unknown.

In February 2008, the United States Virgin Islands were invited to take part in the 2008 Stanford 20/20, whose matches held official Twenty20 status. Fanis made a single appearance for the United States Virgin Islands in their first-round match against Antigua and Barbuda, with their opponents winning the match by 24 runs. He made 10 runs in the match, before being run out by the combination of Juari Edwards and Curtis Roberts.

References

External links
Clifford Fanis at ESPNcricinfo
Clifford Fanis at CricketArchive

1979 births
Living people
United States Virgin Islands cricketers